Esencial is a greatest hits album by Puerto Rican singer Ricky Martin, released by Legacy Recordings on July 6, 2018. It was issued in Spain and Portugal to coincide with Martin's tour in August and September 2018. The two-CD set with 30 songs includes mostly Martin's Spanish-language hits, uptempo tracks on the first disc and ballads on the second.

Background
Between August 14, 2018 and September 1, 2018, Martin toured Spain. Later, between September 4, 2018 and September 9, 2018, he also gave concerts in Hungary, Poland and Czech Republic. To coincide with Martin's tour, Sony Music's Legacy Recordings released Esencial with 30 of his hits, including the latest "Vente Pa' Ca" featuring Maluma and "La Mordidita" featuring Yotuel. Classics like "María", "La Copa de la Vida" and "Livin' la Vida Loca" were also included.

Track listing

Charts

Release history

References

2018 greatest hits albums
Ricky Martin compilation albums
Legacy Recordings compilation albums